Trebbi is an Italian surname. Notable people with the surname include:

Cesare Mauro Trebbi (1847–1931), Italian painter and lithographer
Faustino Trebbi (1761–1836), Italian architect and painter
Mario Trebbi (born 1939), Italian footballer and manager

Italian-language surnames